The Hellbound Heart is a horror novella by Clive Barker, first published in November 1986 by Dark Harvest in the third volume of its Night Visions anthology series. The story features a hedonist criminal acquiring a mystical puzzle box, the Lemarchand Configuration, which can be used to summon the Cenobites, demonic beings who do not distinguish between pain and pleasure. He escapes the Cenobites and, with help, resorts to murder to restore himself to full life. Later on, the puzzle box is found by another.

Along with introducing Barker's Cenobites, the story was the basis for the 1987 film Hellraiser (written and directed by Barker) and its franchise. One Cenobite in particular, nameless in the original novella but nicknamed "Pinhead" by the production crew and fans, became a popular villain among horror movie fans. This character appeared in later Barker prose with the official names "the Hell Priest" and "the Cold Man".

The original novella was re-released as a standalone title by HarperPaperbacks in 1991, after the success of the first film, along with an audiobook recorded by Clive Barker and published by Simon & Schuster Audioworks in 1988. The story retains the gory, visceral style Barker introduced in his anthology series The Books of Blood.

Synopsis
Frank Cotton is a hedonistic criminal selfishly devoted to sensual experience even if it harms others. Believing he has indulged in every pleasure the world can offer, Frank pursues rumours of the Lemarchand Configuration, a puzzle box said to open a "schism" or portal to an extradimensional realm of unfathomable pleasure ruled by beings called the Cenobites. In Düsseldorf, Frank obtains the box and returns with it to his deceased grandmother's home in England. Solving the box, he is confused and horrified when the Cenobites – horribly scarified creatures whose bodies have been modified to the point that they appear sexless and in constant pain – arrive. The Cenobites warn he cannot renege on their agreement once it is made, but Frank still eagerly accepts the offer of experiences he has never known before. With Frank as their newest "experiment", the Cenobites subject him to total sensory overload and he realises their devotion to sadomasochism is so extreme and their personalities so removed from humanity that they no longer differentiate between pain and pleasure and have no care to ever stop even if their subject no longer wishes the experience. Frank is taken to the Cenobite realm, a hellish dimension where he will be subjected to an eternity of torture.

Sometime later, Frank's brother, Rory, moves into the home in England with his wife Julia. Unknown to Rory, Julia had an affair with Frank a week before their wedding and has lusted after him since. While in the attic, Rory accidentally cuts his hand and bleeds on the spot where Frank was taken by the Cenobites. The blood, mixed with semen Frank had left on the floor before he was taken, opens a dimensional schism. Frank returns, his body now reduced to a desiccated corpse by the Cenobites' experiments. Julia later finds him and promises to restore his body so he can truly live and they can be together.

While Rory works, Julia seduces men at bars and brings them to the attic where she murders them. Frank feeds on their bodies, causing his own to slowly regenerate. Kirsty, a friend of Rory's who has romantic feelings for him, suspects Julia is having an affair. Rory suspects the same and while attempting to catch Julia in the act at his request, Kirsty encounters Frank, who attempts to kill her. Kirsty grabs the puzzle box, using it as a weapon before fleeing. She collapses on the street from exhaustion and wakes up in a hospital later. While waiting, she solves the box and inadvertently summons a Cenobite. The Cenobite explains the box is called the Lemarchand Configuration and realizes Kirsty summoned it by accident, but then remarks this does not matter. The Cenobite intends to take Kirsty now that it is here, but she then reveals Frank is alive on Earth again. Though skeptical that one of their experiments could have escaped, the Cenobite is intrigued. It agrees that if Kirsty leads them to Frank and he confirms his identity, they will take him back and perhaps leave her alone.

The Cenobite seems to vanish and Kirsty returns to the house. Rory and Julia claim they killed Frank but Kirsty realizes the man she is speaking to is Frank wearing Rory's skin. Another altercation ensues, during which Frank inadvertently kills Julia. Kirsty then baits Frank into admitting his true name out loud. The Cenobites appear, ensnare Frank and return him to their realm, telling Kirsty to leave. Downstairs, Kirsty sees Julia's disembodied head calling for help. The leader of the Cenobites, a being called the Engineer, then appears and seems to take away Julia as well before briefly bumping into Kirsty. After leaving the house, Kirsty realizes the Engineer gave her the puzzle box to watch over until another seeks it out.

Looking at the box's surface, Kirsty imagines she sees Julia and Frank's faces but not Rory's. She wonders if there are other puzzles that may unlock doors to a paradise where Rory resides, but laments that she may never find one and that broken hearts might be puzzles that cannot be solved.

Background
Barker worked as a male prostitute in the '70s, and his experiences made him want to tell a story about "good and evil in which sexuality was the connective tissue". The look of the cenobites was inspired by S&M clubs, such as an underground club called Cellblock 28 in New York, where people were getting pierced for fun. When he directed and wrote the film adaptation, Barker considered naming the film Sadomasochists from Hell.

Film adaptation

A film adaptation was released in 1987, written and directed by Barker, which subsequently spawned nine sequels, a remake, and a multimedia franchise. In the film, Rory is renamed Larry Cotton. Kirsty is named Kirsty Cotton and is Larry's daughter from a previous marriage rather than a friend and co-worker who has a romantic crush on him. The Lemarchand Configuration is also referred to in the film series as the "Lament Configuration".

Audio adaptation
A full-cast audio adaptation of the novella was released in 2018, adapted by Paul Kane and produced by Bafflegab Productions. It starred Alice Lowe as Kirsty, Neve McIntosh as Julia, and Tom Meeten as both Frank and Rory. Other roles are played by Evie Dawnay, Chris Pavlo, Nicholas Vince, Scott Brooksbank, and Lisa Bowerman (famous for her portrayal of Bernice Summerfield and her work with Big Finish Productions).

The audio play is a faithful adaptation of the original novella. As in the novella, several Cenobites appear but are not named. In the audio play's ending, there is no mention of the Engineer taking away Julia. Kirsty finds herself entrusted with the puzzle box and says she does not want it, but the voices of the Cenobites tell her she has no choice and now belongs to the box. She does not wonder about the existence of puzzle boxes that can lead to Heavens as well as Hells.

Sequels

The novella received two sequels, The Scarlet Gospels written by Clive Barker and published in 2015, and Hellraiser: The Toll published in 2018, written by Mark Alan Miller with the story by Clive Barker. The Cenobites are briefly mentioned in passing (as "the Surgeons") in the book Weaveworld.

The Scarlet Gospels cements that the Cenobites live in the same reality as Clive Barker's occult detective Harry D'Amour. The same novel involves the Cenobite Pinhead, identifying him as "The Hell Priest" and "The Cold Man".

References

External links
The Hellbound Heart Encyclopaedia 
The Night Visions anthology series, on the SF Site
The Hellbound Heart Bibliography @ www.clivebarker.info

1986 British novels
1986 fantasy novels
Novels by Clive Barker
Hellraiser mass media
British novellas
British horror novels
Dark fantasy novels
British novels adapted into films
Weird fiction novels
BDSM literature